Viharagama Grama Niladhari Division is a Grama Niladhari Division of the Nikaweratiya Divisional Secretariat of Kurunegala District of North Western Province, Sri Lanka. It has Grama Niladhari Division Code 295.

Viharagama is a surrounded by the Danduwawa, Mawathagama, Nikaweratiya South, Budumuttawa, Millagoda and Nikaweratiya North Grama Niladhari Divisions.

Demographics

Ethnicity 
The Viharagama Grama Niladhari Division has a Sinhalese majority (99.7%). In comparison, the Nikaweratiya Divisional Secretariat (which contains the Viharagama Grama Niladhari Division) has a Sinhalese majority (95.6%)

Religion 
The Viharagama Grama Niladhari Division has a Buddhist majority (98.0%). In comparison, the Nikaweratiya Divisional Secretariat (which contains the Viharagama Grama Niladhari Division) has a Buddhist majority (93.9%)

References 

Grama Niladhari Divisions of Nikaweratiya Divisional Secretariat